Piteco – Ingá (Pitheco - Ingá) is a 2013 Brazilian graphic novel written and illustrated by Shiko based on the Cavern Clan characters created by Maurício de Sousa. It is part of the Graphic MSP series of graphic novels based on Maurício de Sousa characters.

The title refers to the inscriptions of the Ingá Stone, located in Paraíba, the author Shiko is originating from this state.

Synopsis

Pitheco, Tooga, Ogra and Beleléu are more mature and will face great dangers, when the lake near the village of Lem dry they need to move to another place. Hours before the journey, Tooga is kidnapped and Pitheco decides to go after her with Beleléu as a partner. But to enter into enemy territory, the two brave hunters will expect a surprise and also the help of folkloric entities that protect the forest and the creatures that inhabit it.

References

2013 graphic novels
Brazilian graphic novels
Adventure graphic novels
Monica's Gang
Comics set in prehistory